Marquis Wu of Cai (蔡武侯) (died 837 BC), born as Ji ? (姬?; his name is lost to history), was the sixth ruler of the State of Cai from 863 BC  to 837 BC during the Gonghe Regency.  He was the only known son of Marquis Lì of Cai (蔡厲侯), his predecessor. His reign lasted for 28 years.  He was succeeded by his son.

References
Shiji
Chinese Wikipedia

Zhou dynasty nobility
Cai (state)
837 BC deaths
9th-century BC Chinese monarchs
Year of birth unknown